The Young Australian Journalist of the Year award was launched in Australia in 2008 by the Walkley Foundation for Journalism, as a companion to its Walkley Awards for journalism. The latter is known as an Australian equivalent of the Pulitzer Prize.

Awards are in five categories: print, television, radio, online and photography, to recognise the best work from Australian journalists aged 26 and under. From these category winners, the Board will choose one candidate who will be named the inaugural Young Australian Journalist of the Year.

2008
The awards were announced on 24 July 2008:
Inaugural: Sophie McNeill of SBS-TV
Print: Ben Doherty, The Age
Television: Sophie McNeill
Radio: Michael Atkin, Triple J's "Hack"
Online: Asher Moses, a reporter on the Sydney Morning Herald'''s website, for his story about politicians editing Wikipedia
Photography: Andrew Quilty, The Australian Financial Review2009
The awards were announced on 25 June 2009:
Young Australian Journalist of the Year overall winner: Julia Medew, The AgePrint: Julia Medew, The AgeTelevision: Yaara Bou Melhem, SBS-TV
Radio: Michael Atkin, Triple J "Hack"
Online: Nic MacBean, ABC Online
Photography: Sandie Bertrand, The West Australian''

References

Australian literary awards
Australian journalism awards
Awards established in 2008